John Charles Vockler FODC (22 July 19246 February 2014) was an Australian bishop and Franciscan friar. He was originally a bishop in the Anglican Church of Australia but later become the primate of the Anglican Catholic Church, a Continuing Anglican church.

Vockler was educated at the University of Adelaide and trained for ordination at St John's College, Morpeth. He was ordained as an Anglican priest in 1948. He was an assistant priest at Christ Church Cathedral, Newcastle, then vice-warden of St John's College, University of Queensland. After a short time in New York he was a lecturer in theology at St John's Theological College, Morpeth, New South Wales. Later he was Archdeacon of the Eyre Peninsula and an assistant bishop in the Diocese of Adelaide: he was consecrated a bishop in November 1959. In 1963 he became the Bishop of Polynesia, a post he held for five years. After resigning as Bishop of Polynesia in 1968, he was professed as an Anglican Franciscan friar (as Brother John-Charles) and was later a member of the more conservative Franciscan Order of the Divine Compassion. He served as an Assistant Bishop of Chelmsford from 1972 until 1974, and Assistant Bishop of Southwark from 1974 to 1975. After moving to the United States he was initially an assistant bishop in the Episcopal Diocese of Quincy.

He was received into the Anglican Catholic Church in 1994. He initially resided at Holyrood Seminary in Liberty, New York, but was appointed bishop of the Anglican Catholic Church's Diocese of New Orleans in 1999 in succession to Dean Stephens who had died suddenly earlier that year. He was the archbishop of the Anglican Catholic Church from 2001 to 2005. He retired as both archbishop of the ACC and Bishop of New Orleans in 2005 and moved to his native Australia.

As an author he wrote several books, including Can Anglicans Believe Anything: The Nature and Spirit of Anglicanism, One Man’s Journey (1972); and Two Paths to Holiness.

Vockler died peacefully at his home in Australia, early in the morning of the old Feast of St. Titus, on 6 February 2014.

Notes

1924 births
2014 deaths
Assistant bishops in the Anglican Diocese of Adelaide
Australian Continuing Anglicans
Clergy from Sydney
University of Adelaide alumni
Anglican bishops of Polynesia
20th-century Anglican bishops in Oceania
Bishops of Continuing Anglicanism
Bishops in the Cook Islands